Ercole Cattaneo (3 December 1906 – 26 July 1978) was an Italian figure skater. He competed in the pairs event at the 1936 Winter Olympics.

References

1906 births
1978 deaths
Italian male pair skaters
Olympic figure skaters of Italy
Figure skaters at the 1936 Winter Olympics
Figure skaters from Milan